Lower Town may refer to several places:


Canada
Lower Town, a neighbourhood in Ottawa
Lower Town (or Basse-Ville in French), a neighbourhood in Quebec City

Croatia
Donji grad, Zagreb (English: Lower Town), a historic neighbourhood in Zagreb

Estonia
All-linn (Estonian for "Lower Town"), the historic neighbourhood of Tallinn, Estonia, as opposed to the Toomea Hill

United Kingdom
Lower Town, Devon, England
Lower Town, Herefordshire, England
Lower Town, Isles of Scilly, Cornwall
Lower Town, Pembrokeshire, Wales
Lower Town, West Yorkshire, England, an area of Oxenhope
Lower Town, Worcestershire, England

United States
Lower Town, California
Lower Towns (Cherokee), historic Cherokee residential area in northeastern Alabama, northwestern Georgia, and their adjoining areas of southeastern Tennessee